The Frequency was an independent rock band from Los Angeles, CA. Marc Cazorla 
and Alex Stiff, later of The Record Company, were the core songwriting and recording duo behind the music. They 
used an array of analog and vintage instruments to create sounds  
described by NME as "stripped back music strengthened by simplicity as much as 
beauty". Q Magazine gave the release "Morning to 3 A.M." 3 out of 4 
stars and hailed the band as "able to form perfectly crafted Air-like synth-pop 
while also stretching their wings on the 17 minute ever-shifting psych rock 
track 'Ego Is the Drug/3 A.M.'

In 2010, The Frequency signed a worldwide publishing deal with Chrysalis Music in the UK. The song "Jim Gordon Part II" played all over the 
globe due to being licensed for a yearlong BlackBerry television commercial 
campaign. Music from The Frequency was also featured in major motion pictures 
and television shows.

Inspired by music from Pink Floyd, Air, Can, and Spiritualized, the live show added 
intensity to the music. The Frequency shared the stage with diverse artists, such as Black Rebel Motorcycle Club, The Bravery, Primus, Matisyahu, Mutemath, and Lotus. The show was described as an audio/visual feast for the senses and led Quebec City's Live Daily newspaper to 
declare "The Frequency should be on every rock fan's radar."

The Frequency's "Jim Gordon Part II"  was nominated for the 7th Annual Independent Music Awards for Jam Song of the year.

Band members 
 Marc Cazorla - Fender Rhodes, Moog, Piano, Synthesizer, Vocals
 Alex Stiff - Guitars, Vocals, Bass, Keyboards
 Mark Quinn - drums, sampler

In 2011, Marc Cazorla and Alex Stiff joined with musician Chris Vos to form The Record Company.

Discography 
EPs and Albums
2010 - Absence of Giants - Spring 2010
2009 - Morning to 3am EP - Trussed Recordings
2008 - We Are the Same Machine - self-release
2007 - The Frequency EP - Ropeadope Digital

Compilations
 Explorations: Classic Picante Regrooved - 2006 - Concord Records

Appearances in media
 Their song "Why Do I Fear?" was featured in the final scene and end credits of "Across the Line: The Exodus of Charlie Wright"
 In January 2010 "Sanity Overture" was featured in an episode of BBC's Being Human (UK TV series)
 Their song "Stars" is featured in Lions Gate's 2008 film "The Eye". It plays in the final scene and during the end credits.
 The Song "Jim Gordon Part II" appeared in a Blackberry commercial

References

 NME Free Download Mar 10
 NME Free Download Oct 09
 NME Review July 09
 DMC Update Album Of The Week July 09
 Jambase
 Live Daily Quebec International Summer Music Festival Review
 Ropeadope Digital Website

External links
 The Frequency's official website
 The Frequency's myspace
 The Frequency on Facebook
 The Frequency on Twitter
 www.absenceofgiants.com

Indie rock musical groups from California
Musical groups from Los Angeles
Independent Music Awards winners